Hijack is an upcoming thriller miniseries created by George Kay and Jim Field Smith.

Premise
A talented business negotiator must use his skills to broker a peaceful end to a hijacking of a flight to London.

Cast
 Idris Elba as Sam Nelson
 Archie Panjabi as Zahra Gahfoor
 Max Beesley
 Mohamed Elsandel as Jaden
 Holly Aird as Amanda
 Aimée Kelly as Jamie Constantinou
 Antonia Salib as Leesha
 Zora Bishop as Deevia
 Fatima Adoum as Rashida
 Ananya Chadha
 Nebras Jamali as Nasir
 Lucia Aliu as Lizzy Blakefield
 Mei Henri as Naomi
 Chantelle Alle as Kacey

Production
It was announced in April 2022 that Apple TV+ had greenlit the miniseries, which would see Idris Elba starring and executive producing. George Kay will write the series, and Jim Field Smith will direct. In May, Archie Panjabi joined the cast.

Production began on 9 May 2022 in Aylesbury, and is expected to film until October 2022.

References

External links
Hijack at the Internet Movie Database

Apple TV+ original programming
Upcoming drama television series
English-language television shows
Television shows about aviation accidents or incidents
Television shows filmed in England
Aircraft hijackings in fiction